Dorothée Munyaneza (born 1982) is a British-Rwandan singer, actress, dancer and choreographer. She has produced two performance pieces, Samedi Détente and Unwanted, both about the Rwandan genocide.

Personal life
Munyaneza was born in Kigali, Rwanda. Her father is a pastor, and her mother is a journalist. Munyaneza and her family left Kigali during the Rwandan genocide, when Munyaneza was aged 12. Her mother worked for a non-governmental organisation, and was therefore able to secure the family a safe passage to London. There she studied at the Lycée Français Charles de Gaulle. Whilst studying, she met Christine Sigwart, founder of the Jonas Foundation, a charity that aims to help integrate immigrant children. She became interested in music, and studied music at the Jonas Foundation. Munyaneza studied music and social sciences at Canterbury Christ Church University. She now resides in Marseille, France, and has a daughter.

Career
Munyaneza was inspired to work on the Rwandan genocide topic after seeing documentaries on the subject, especially one by Thierry Michel about the work of Denis Mukwege.

Munyaneza worked on the sound track for the Hotel Rwanda film. She started out as a singer and storyteller for the film, but then started dancing in a style similar to how she had danced as a child in Rwanda. As a singer, she released her first solo album in 2010, which was produced by Martin Russell. In 2012, she collaborated with British composer James Seymour Brett to produce the album Earth Songs. In 2013, she starred in a performance by Rachid Ouramdane in Rennes, France. During the performance, she chanted the names of Algerians killed during the Paris massacre of 1961.

In 2014, Munyaneza produced the work Samedi Détente (Saturday relaxation). It focused upon the Rwandan genocide, how 800,000 people died in 100 days, and her own personal experience of the genocide. The work debuted in Nîmes, France.

In 2017, she produced Unwanted, her second work about the Rwandan genocide. The work featured French composer , and focused on interviews between Munyaneza and survivors of the genocide, as well as women in Congo, Chad, Syria, and the countries that were formerly part of the SFR Yugoslavia. Unwanted has a particular focus on raped women and their conceived children.

References

1982 births
Living people
Rwandan women singers
British actresses
Rwandan actresses
British female dancers
British choreographers
21st-century British women singers
Alumni of Canterbury Christ Church University
Rwandan emigrants to the United Kingdom